Greek National Road 18 is a national highway of Greece. It connects Preveza with Igoumenitsa.

18
Roads in Epirus (region)